The Climate Party is a Green conservative party in the United Kingdom. It has been compared to the Teal independents in Australia, which won a record 6 seats in the House of Representatives in 2022.

The party was founded in 2022 by its leader, Ed Gemell, a councillor for Hazlemere in Buckinghamshire. It was founded as a centre-right, single issue party. It seeks to provide Conservative voters with a 'business-friendly and climate-serious alternative.'

The party plans to challenge the Conservatives at the next election in 110 marginal seats, specifically targeting MPs who 'obstruct climate action'.

Ideology
The party's core focus is on tackling climate change and decarbonising the economy by 2030. It describes itself as '100% focused on climate change'. As such, it has announced a number of policies in this area, including stopping all subsidies for fossil fuel companies, implementing polluter-pays policies and investing in green technology.

External links
The party's electoral commission page
Twitter
Instagram

References

Centre-right parties in the United Kingdom
Conservative parties in the United Kingdom
Green conservative parties
Political parties established in 2022
2022 establishments in the United Kingdom